Scott Logan Verrett (born June 19, 1990) is an American former professional baseball pitcher. He made his Major League Baseball (MLB) debut with the Texas Rangers in 2015 and also played for the New York Mets and Baltimore Orioles. Prior to playing professionally, he played for  Calallen High School and Baylor University.

Amateur career
Verrett spent his early years in The Woodlands, Texas, where he played Little League Baseball as an infielder. Before he began high school, his family moved to Corpus Christi, and he played for Calallen High School's varsity baseball team as a pitcher. In 2008, his senior year, he became the staff's ace pitcher, recording an 18–0 win–loss record, a 0.67 earned run average (ERA), 167 strikeouts, and 12 complete games. He also had a .455 batting average, seven home runs, and 33 runs batted in on the year. With a 42–1 win–loss record, his team went on to win the Texas Class 4A state championship. That year, he was named the All-South Texas Most Valuable Player and the Class 4A Player of the Year by the Texas Sports Writers Association.

Verrett enrolled at Baylor University to play college baseball for the Baylor Bears baseball team. As a relief pitcher in his freshman year, he recorded seven wins and a save in his first eight appearances, and served as the team's closer. He moved into the team's starting rotation as a sophomore, and finished the year with a 5–3 win–loss record, a 3.28 ERA, and 97 strikeouts in  innings pitched. As a junior, Verrett compiled a 7–6 win–loss record, a 2.93 ERA, 96 strikeouts in  innings pitched, and had two complete games. In 2009 and 2010, he played collegiate summer baseball with the Chatham Anglers of the Cape Cod Baseball League and was named a league all-star in 2010.

Professional career

New York Mets

The New York Mets selected Verrett in the third round, with the 101st overall selection, of the 2011 MLB Draft. Verrett signed with the Mets, receiving a $425,000 signing bonus. He signed just before the August signing deadline, and did not make his professional debut until 2012, when he began the season with the Savannah Sand Gnats of the Class A South Atlantic League. During the season, he received a promotion to the St. Lucie Mets of the Class A-Advanced Florida State League in July. Between the two levels, he finished the year with a 5–2 win–loss record, a 2.70 ERA, and 93 strikeouts in 103 innings pitched, despite missing two months due to a strained rotator cuff. He was named the South Texas Professional Player of the Year by the Corpus Christi Hooks, who play in the Class AA Texas League.

Verrett pitched for the Binghamton Mets of the Class AA Eastern League in 2013, finishing the season with a 12–6 win–loss record, a 4.25 ERA, a 1.144 walks plus hits per innings pitched ratio and 146 strikeouts in 24 games started. The Mets invited Verrett to spring training in 2014 as a non-roster player. He pitched for the Las Vegas 51s of the Class AAA Pacific Coast League in 2014, where he had an 11–5 record and a 4.33 ERA in 28 games.

Texas Rangers
During the 2014 Winter Meetings, the Baltimore Orioles selected Verrett from the Mets in the Rule 5 draft. After competing for a spot on the Orioles' Opening Day roster in spring training in 2015, the Orioles waived Verrett with the hopes of him going unclaimed so that they could work out a trade with the Mets, allowing them to keep Verrett. Instead, he was claimed on waivers by the Texas Rangers. Verrett made the Rangers' Opening Day roster. He made four appearances with the Rangers, pitching to a 6.00 ERA in nine innings, before he was designated for assignment by the Rangers on April 24.

With the Rangers, he finished 0-1, 6.00 ERA in 4 games pitching 9 innings with a WHIP of 1.667 while giving up 11 hits, 7 runs (6 of them earned), 1 home run, and 4 walks and striking out 3 batters.

Return to the Mets
The Rangers returned Verrett to the Mets on May 4, 2015, and assigned to Las Vegas. After Verrett pitched to a 2–0 win–loss record and a 3.00 ERA in 11 appearances, four of which were starts, the Mets promoted Verrett to the major leagues on June 18. Verrett pitched to a 0.73 ERA with 12 strikeouts in  innings before the Mets optioned him to Las Vegas due to the activation of Jenrry Mejía from the suspended list on July 7. The Mets promoted Verrett to the major leagues on August 18, when Bobby Parnell went on the disabled list. In his first major league start in place of Matt Harvey, Verrett pitched eight innings, striking out eight and giving up one run in his first career win against the Colorado Rockies at Coors Field with the Mets winning 5–1. Verrett finished the 2015 season with a 1–1 record and 3.03 ERA in  innings pitched.

Verrett made the Mets' roster for Opening Day in 2016. On April 13, 2016, Verrett made his first start of the season and second of his career against the Miami Marlins at Citi Field in place of Jacob deGrom. Verrett pitched six scoreless innings, and received a no decision.

On April 19, 2016, he made his second start of the year against the Philadelphia Phillies at Citizens Bank Park. He once again pitched six scoreless innings just allowing six hits, one walk and striking out four for his first win of the season. The Mets would go on to win 11–1. In his first two starts, he hasn't allowed a run while striking out ten in twelve innings. Verrett also recorded his first major league hit, a double on 1–0 pitch from the opposing pitcher Vince Velasquez to lead off the fifth inning.

Baltimore Orioles
The Mets traded Verrett to the Baltimore Orioles on November 30, 2016, for cash considerations. He made his Orioles debut on April 30, pitching 2 scoreless innings and getting the win. He elected free agency on September 30, 2017.

NC Dinos
On November 18, 2017, Verrett signed a one-year contract worth $800,000 with the NC Dinos of the KBO League. He became a free agent following the season.

Oakland Athletics
On February 8, 2019, Verrett signed a minor league deal with the Oakland Athletics. He became a free agent following the 2019 season.

Cleburne Railroaders
On March 12, 2021, Verrett signed with the Cleburne Railroaders of the American Association of Professional Baseball. Verrett made 1 appearance for Cleburne, pitching 6.0 innings of 1-run ball.

Seattle Mariners
On May 23, 2021, Verrett’s contract was purchased by the Seattle Mariners organization. Verrett made 19 starts with the Triple-A Tacoma Rainiers, going 11–4 with a 4.74 ERA and 88 strikeouts. He became a free agent following the season.

Washington Nationals
On February 18, 2022, Verrett signed a minor league contract with the Washington Nationals. He elected free agency on November 10, 2022.

Personal life
Verrett and his wife, Erin, reside in Arlington, Texas.

References

External links

1990 births
Living people
Sportspeople from Harris County, Texas
People from The Woodlands, Texas
People from Corpus Christi, Texas
Baseball players from Texas
Major League Baseball pitchers
Texas Rangers players
New York Mets players
Baltimore Orioles players
Baylor Bears baseball players
Chatham Anglers players
Savannah Sand Gnats players
St. Lucie Mets players
Binghamton Mets players
Las Vegas 51s players
Norfolk Tides players
KBO League pitchers
American expatriate baseball players in South Korea
NC Dinos players
Midland RockHounds players
Tacoma Rainiers players
Cleburne Railroaders players
Rochester Red Wings players